Tyron Lyle Brackenridge (born June 30, 1984) is a former Canadian football defensive backs coach for the Toronto Argonauts of the Canadian Football League. He is a former gridiron football cornerback who played the majority of his career with the Saskatchewan Roughriders of the Canadian Football League, where he won a Grey Cup championship in 2013. He was signed by the Kansas City Chiefs as an undrafted free agent in 2007. He played college football at Washington State.

Brackenridge was also a member of the New York Jets and Jacksonville Jaguars.

Professional career

Kansas City Chiefs
Brackenridge signed a free agent contract with the National Football League's Kansas City Chiefs on May 8, 2007.

In Week 4 of the 2007 season, Brackenridge scored the first touchdown of his career as he returned a fumble.

Brackenridge was released by the Chiefs during final cuts on August 31, 2008. He was re-signed on October 30 after cornerback Dmitri Patterson was released. The Chiefs released Brackenridge again November 5.

New York Jets
Brackenridge was signed to a contract by the New York Jets on February 19, 2009. He was waived by the team on May 19, 2009.

Jacksonville Jaguars
Brackenridge was claimed off waivers by the Jacksonville Jaguars on May 20, 2009. Due to injuries to fellow Jaguars cornerback Rashean Mathis, Brackenridge started 5 games in 2009. He made 33 tackles with 5 passes defended in his run as the starting corner opposite Derek Cox. After two seasons in Jacksonville, he was released on July 29, 2011.

Saskatchewan Roughriders
Tyron Brackenridge signed with the Saskatchewan Roughriders of the Canadian Football League. He saw limited playing time in his first season in the CFL. However, in his second season with the Roughriders, Brackenridge accumulated 77 tackles and 2 interceptions. Following his breakout 2012 CFL season the Roughriders re-signed Brackenridge on February 15, 2013. In 2013, Brackenridge was honoured as the Hardest Hitter in the 2013 CFL season. He was named a CFL All-Star for the first time in his career, finishing the season with 48 tackles, 6 special teams tackles and 3 interceptions. His fourth season in the CFL was again highly productive and he was once again named a CFL All-Star. During the 2014 campaign he amassed 64 tackles, 10 special teams tackles, 3 interceptions and 2 quarterback sacks. About 2 weeks prior to becoming a free-agent Brackenridge and the Roughriders agreed to a contract extension.  Tyron was released by the Saskatchewan Roughriders on December 15, 2015.  

On April 20, 2016, Brackenridge announced his retirement from professional football.

Coaching career
In 2017, Brackenridge became the Assistant Defensive Backs Coach for the Toronto Argonauts. He was promoted to Defensive Backs Coach for the 2018 season.

References

External links
Saskatchewan Roughriders bio
Jacksonville Jaguars bio
Kansas City Chiefs bio
New York Jets bio
Washington State Cougars bio

1984 births
Living people
American football cornerbacks
Canadian football defensive backs
Jacksonville Jaguars players
Kansas City Chiefs players
New York Jets players
Players of American football from Pasadena, California
Players of Canadian football from Pasadena, California
Saskatchewan Roughriders players
Washington State Cougars football players